Melissa Merchiche (born August 21, 1985 in Marseille), better known by her stage name Melissa M or simply Melissa, is a French R&B singer of Algerian origin. Her debut album entitled Avec Tout Mon Amour and two successful singles, "Elle" and "Cette Fois" was on April 23, 2007. Avec Tout Mon Amour was ranked in the French Top 50.  Her second album entitled Melissa M was released in 2009. In November 2013 the single "Jump" was released to help promote her upcoming third album, which is still untitled. She currently lives in Gardanne, France.

Biography
Melissa M was born on August 21, 1985 in Marseille, in the southern French region of Provence-Alpes-Côte d'Azur. Her parents are from the Algerian city of Bejaia.

Passionate about music since her childhood, she began singing at the age of 10. She participated in various competitions in her hometown and while taking singing lessons. Her big sister entered a day at the age of 14 years at issuance Seeds star 4, but lost in the final. At 18 while preparing for her CAP salon, she met the French production duo Kilomaitre. Originally she wanted to use the stage name Melissa but that name had already been taken by another singer. So she added the letter M, which is the first letter of her last name (Merchiche).

Discography

Albums

DD = Digital downloads

Singles

DD = Digital downloads

Awards/Nominations

References

 Melissa M discography and peak positions in France, on Lescharts.com
 Label site

1985 births
Living people
French people of Algerian descent
French people of Kabyle descent
Musicians from Marseille
21st-century French singers
21st-century French women singers